In cryptography, the hybrid argument is a proof technique used to show that two distributions are computationally indistinguishable.

Formal description
Formally, to show two distributions D1 and D2 are computationally indistinguishable, we can define a sequence of hybrid distributions D1 := H0, H1, ..., Ht =: D2 where t is polynomial in the security parameter n. Define the advantage of any probabilistic efficient (polynomial-bounded time) algorithm A as

where the dollar symbol ($) denotes that we sample an element from the distribution at random.

By triangle inequality, it is clear that for any probabilistic polynomial time algorithm A,

Thus there must exist some k s.t. 0 ≤ k < t(n) and

Since t is polynomial-bounded, for any such algorithm A, if we can show that it has a negligible advantage function between distributions Hi and Hi+1 for every i, that is,

then it immediately follows that its advantage to distinguish the distributions D1 = H0 and D2 = Ht must also be negligible. This fact gives rise to the hybrid argument: it suffices to find such a sequence of hybrid distributions and show each pair of them is computationally indistinguishable.

Applications
The hybrid argument is extensively used in cryptography. Some simple proofs using hybrid arguments are:
 If one cannot efficiently predict the next bit of the output of some number generator, then this generator is a pseudorandom number generator (PRG).
 We can securely expand a PRG with 1-bit output into a PRG with n-bit output.

Notes

References
 
 
 

Cryptography